Luke Murray (born 2 May 1980) is a New Zealand cricketer. He played in one List A match for Central Districts in 2007.

See also
 List of Central Districts representative cricketers

References

External links
 

1980 births
Living people
New Zealand cricketers
Central Districts cricketers
Cricketers from Palmerston North